Devičie is a village and municipality in the Krupina District of the Banská Bystrica Region of Slovakia. Starostom je Roman Lenhard.

History
Settlements from the Bronze Age and Thracian and Hallstatt finds have been made here.

In historical records, the village was first mentioned in 1256 when King Béla IV resettled persons from Devičie to Hontianske Nemce. In the 16th century it belonged to Čabraď castle (Kőváry and Terjény families).

Genealogical resources

The records for genealogical research are available at the state archive "Statny Archiv in Banska Bystrica, Slovakia"

 Roman Catholic church records (births/marriages/deaths): 1828-1895 (parish B)
 Lutheran church records (births/marriages/deaths): 1786-1895 (parish A)

See also
 List of municipalities and towns in Slovakia

External links
 
 
https://web.archive.org/web/20071116010355/http://www.statistics.sk/mosmis/eng/run.html
https://web.archive.org/web/20070428141121/http://www.regionhont.sk/index.php?session=0&action=read&click=open&article=1103469694
Surnames of living people in Devicie

Villages and municipalities in Krupina District